Verissimo, initially titled Verissimo - Tutti i colori della cronaca is an Italian entertainment television news program covering events and celebrities which debuted on 1996 on Canale 5. It has been produced in collaboration with TG5 until 2006, when the program switched to Videonews.

From September 1996 until June 2006, it was a daily show, initially hosted by the journalist Cristina Parodi and the replaced by Benedetta Corbi and Giuseppe Brindisi and after by Paola Perego. From September 2006, it became a weekly show hosted by Silvia Toffanin and entirely dedicated to gossip and interviews.

References 

Mediaset
Mass media in Rome
Entertainment news shows
Italian television news shows
1996 Italian television series debuts
1990s Italian television series
2000s Italian television series
2010s Italian television series
Television news program articles using incorrect naming style
Canale 5 original programming